Vem or VEM may refer to:
 Vem, a Brazilian ticketing system
 Vem (album), a 1999 album by Grönwalls
 VEM Aktienbank, a German bank
 Variable entrant map, a variant of Karnaugh maps in logic optimization
 VEM (Venus Emissivity Mapper), a multispectral imaging instrument aboard the NASA mission VERITAS and the ESA mission EnVision (as VenSpec-M).

See also 
 VEMS, a supplier of computer components